The 1999–2000 FC Bayern Munich season was the 100th season in the club's history.  FC Bayern Munich clinched its second consecutive league title, its third consecutive DFB-Ligapokal championship, and the 1999–2000 DFB-Pokal.

Squad

Squad, appearances and goals 

|-
|colspan="12"|Players sold or loaned out after the start of the season:

|}

Goals

Bookings

Transfers and loans

Transfers in

Total spending:  €16,550,000

Transfers out

Total income:  €3,450,000

Results

Bundesliga
The 1999–2000 Bundesliga campaign began on 14 August when Bayern played in the opening game of the season against Hamburg.

DFB Pokal

Champions League

Group stage results

1st Group Stage

2nd Group Stage

Knockout stage

Quarter-final

Semi-final

Sources
Soccerbase.com
Kicker

FC Bayern Munich seasons
Bayern Munich
German football championship-winning seasons